East Atlanta Love Letter is the second studio album by American singer 6lack. It was released on September 14, 2018 by LVRN and Interscope Records. This is the follow up to his 2016 release, "Free 6lack". The production on the album was handled by multiple producers including T-Minus, Cardiak, Joel Little and Bizness Boi among others. The album also features guest appearances from Future, J. Cole, Offset and Khalid. 

East Atlanta Love Letter was supported by two singles: "Switch" and "Nonchalant". The album received positive reviews from music critics and was a commercial success. It debuted at number three on the US Billboard 200 chart, earning 77,000 album-equivalent units in its first week. The album was also certified gold by the Recording Industry Association of America (RIAA) in December 2020.

Background and release
In June 2018, 6lack posted a picture on his social media saying "I think my album is done". While talking about the album in interview with Highsnobiety, 6lack said;

On August 13, 2018, he announced that it will be titled East Atlanta Love Letter". On August 29, he announced the album's release date and posted the artwork, which features him in a makeshift studio with his daughter, Syx Rose Valentine. On September 11, he shared the official track listing and released the album on September 14.

Promotion
The first single from the album, "Switch", was released on June 22, 2018. The music video for "Switch" was released on July 16, 2018. "Nonchalant" was released as the album's second single on August 17, 2018, with its accompanying music video.

For further promotion of the album, 6lack started a tour in October 2018. He is joined by THEY., Boogie, Tierra Whack, Summer Walker, Deante' Hitchcock, and Ari Lennox.

Critical reception

East Atlanta Love Letter received positive reviews from critics. At Metacritic, which assigns a normalized rating out of 100 to reviews from mainstream publications, the album received an average score of 74 based on 4 reviews. In a positive review, Kitty Richardson of The Line of Best Fit concluded 6lack "trumped his opponents and influences with a fragile grace and solid talent for songwriting, echoing that of our most decorated balladeers. It's a hope that the album's use of an undeniably fashionable sound doesn't hinder its potential for timelessness; there is so much here to fall for." Luke Fox of Exclaim! described East Atlanta Love Letter as "impeccably cohesive", praising the minimalist production and adding the album is "a record that captures the trap-soul zeitgeist that will best catch you in your feelings." Online hip hop publication HipHopDX praised the album, stating: "In an era where artists hype up projects that turn out to be nothing but half-baked playlists, 6LACK’s thoughtful embrace of the album format is refreshing. East Atlanta Love Letter is a moody masterpiece that may very well take the artist’s career to new heights."

In a mixed review, Dean Van Nguyen of Pitchfork criticised the album's lyrical content, commenting that 6lack "traps listeners within the four walls of his drab hotel room, exposing us to his joyless, low-energy meditations that don’t capture relationships or the human experience in any kind of meaningful way."

Year-end lists

Commercial performance
East Atlanta Love Letter debuted at number three on the US Billboard 200 chart, earning 77,000 album-equivalent units (including 20,000 copies as pure album sales) in its first week. This became 6lack's first US top-ten debut and his highest-charting release in the US to date. In its second week, the album dropped to number 12 on the chart, earning an additional 32,000 units. On December 10,  2020, the album was certified gold by the Recording Industry Association of America (RIAA) for combined sales and album-equivalent units of over 500,000 units in the United States.

Track listing
Credits were adapted from Tidal and 6lack's official website.

Notes
  signifies an additional producer
 "East Atlanta Love Letter" features uncredited background vocals by Mereba
 "Let Her Go" and "Sorry" features uncredited additional vocals by Tierra Whack
 "Disconnect" and "Balenciaga Challenge" features uncredited additional vocals by LightSkinKeisha
 "Switch" features background vocals by Ty Dolla Sign
 "Stan" features background vocals by Zalma Bour

Sample credits
 "Unfair" contains elements from "More Than Anyone", written by Gavin DeGraw and performed by Allyson Magno.
 "Stan" contains elements from "New Grave", written by Jerome Potter, Samuel Griesemer, Kevin Drew and Kelly Zutrau and performed by DJDS.

Personnel
Credits were adapted from Tidal and 6lack's official website.

 Evan Miles – recording 
 JT Gagarin – recording 
 Yakob – recording 
 6lack – recording 
 Manny Marroquin – mixing 
 Chris Galland – mixing engineer 
 Robin Florent – mixing engineer 
 Scott Desmarais – mixing engineer 
 Michelle Mancini – mastering

Charts

Weekly charts

Year-end charts

Certifications

References

2018 albums
Albums produced by T-Minus (record producer)
Albums produced by Joel Little
Interscope Records albums